Jean-Baptiste de Secondat baron de La Brède  (12 February 1716 – 17 June 1796) was an 18th-century French naturalist botanist, and agronomist. He was the eldest son of Charles de Secondat Montesquieu, Baron de La Brède (1689–1755) and Jeanne Catherine de Lartigue (1689–1770).

Some publications

Books 

 1749: Considérations sur le commerce et la navigation de la Grande-Bretagne, by Joshua Gee, translated from English

Honors

Eponymous

 (Fagaceae) Quercus secondatii Steud.

References

External links 
 Jean Baptiste de Secondat on data.bnf.fr
 Jean-Baptiste de Secondat de Montesquieu on IPNI
 Biography
 Éloges de Montesquieu par Jean-Baptiste de Secondat et D’Alembert
 Genealogy

18th-century French botanists
French agronomists
Montesquieu
English–French translators
18th-century French historians
1716 births
1796 deaths